Gertrude Huston (1919 – August 26, 1998) was an American artist and illustrator known for designing book covers for New Directions.

Early life and education 
Gertrude Huston was born in New York City in 1919 and grew up in New York and Wilton, Connecticut.

Huston graduated from Parsons School of Design.

Career 

Huston worked at the Helena Rubinstein salon in New York. After a tenure at Lucien Long in Chicago, Huston returned to New York City to work at Blaker Advertising Agency. Huston was also a contract employee at the Ford Foundation.

Huston began designing books for New Directions on a freelance basis. She designed books for the publishing company from the late 1940s through the late 1970s. She also served as Art Director of New Directions.

In his book "Literchoor Is My Beat": A Life of James Laughlin, Publisher of New Directions, Ian S. MacNiven describes Huston's book design style:"Her covers suggested the influence of Alvin Lustig but tended more toward the whimsical: for the second printing of Thomas's Portrait of the Artist as a Young Dog, she made a line drawing of a show-clipped French poodle, anglicized with a pipe and derby, sitting at a typewriter. It was humorous, but it certainly was not Dylan."Huston ended her regular work with New Directions in 1978, after a clash with Dan Allman — then head of book design — over the design of H.D.'s End to Torment: A Memoir of Ezra Pound. She continued to design book covers for the publishing company only occasionally afterwards.

Outside of her book design work, Huston served as the secretary of Community Board No. 5 in Manhattan. She was active at the Midtown South Police Precinct Community Council and Encore Community Services at St. Malachy's Church. She served as president of the Rose Hill Neighborhood Association. A fan of jazz music, Huston was a member of the Duke Ellington Society, and lobbied to have Ellington formally memorialized in New York City.

Selected New Directions books designed by Huston 

 The Blood Oranges by John Hawkes
 The Selected Poems of Irving Layton
 Sun Rock Man by Cid Corman
 Arrival: Book 1 of Daily Lives in Aghsi-Altai by Robert Nichols
 The Delights of Turkey: Twenty Tales by Edouard Roditi
 The Asian Journal of Thomas Merton by Thomas Merton
 The Way of Chuang Tzu by Thomas Merton
 A Dark Stranger by Julien Gracq
 Portrait of the Artist as a Young Dog (second ed.) by Dylan Thomas

Other books designed by Huston 

 In Another Country by James Laughlin

Personal life 
Huston lost a husband in World War Two. Huston met New Directions founder James Laughlin at a Halloween dance party in 1945. The pair maintained an affair through both of Laughlin's earlier marriages, though they married on December 5, 1990.

Death 
Gertrude Huston died in Norfolk, Connecticut on August 26, 1998, after a long illness.

References

External links 

 New Directors Publishing Corp. records at Houghton Library, Harvard University

1919 births
1998 deaths
Book designers
American graphic designers
American women illustrators
20th-century American women artists
20th-century American people